America and Americans is a 1966 collection of John Steinbeck's journalism. It was Steinbeck's last book.

References

External links
 Reviews on goodreads

Books by John Steinbeck
1966 books
Essay collections
Heinemann (publisher) books